The Ruwer-Hochwald-Radweg is a cyclable trail. It is for bicycles. It  links the Moselle-valley and
the Hunsrück from Trier to Hermeskeil in Rhineland-Palatinate, Germany.
The length is about 48 km:
 Trier-Ruwer - Mertesdorf - Kasel - Waldrach: 5,8 km
 Waldrach - Sommerau - Gusterath-Tal - Pluwigerhammer: 7,7 km
 Pluwigerhammer - Hinzenburg - Burg Heid: 6,0 km
 Burg Heid - Hentern - Zerf: 5,6 km
 Zerf - Niederkell: 5,4 km
 Niederkell - Kell am See: 4,0 km
 Kell am See - Reinsfeld: 7,0 km
 Reinsfeld - Hermeskeil: 6,3 km

External links 

 www.ruwer-hochwald-radweg.de

Transport in Rhineland-Palatinate
Cycleways in Germany